Agua Dulce is a city in Nueces County, in the U.S. state of Texas. It is located on the Texas Mexican Railway at the intersection of Farm Road 70 and State Highway 44 in west-central Nueces County. The name, Spanish for "sweet water", refers to a nearby creek. A town in Texas, Sweetwater in Nolan County in West Texas, uses the English name.

The town was established by the 1900s.

The population of Agua Dulce was 685 in the 2020 census.

Geography

Agua Dulce is located at  (27.783077, –97.910033).

Demographics

As of the 2020 United States census, there were 685 people, 219 households, and 165 families residing in the city.

2000 Census data
As of the census of 2000,  737 people, 234 households, and 200 families were residing in the city. Its population density was 2,338.1 people per square mile (889.2/km2). The 257 housing units averaged 815.3 per  mi2 (310.1/km2). The racial makeup of the city was 79.38% White, 0.14% African American, 0.68% Native American, 16.15% from other races, and 3.66% from two or more races. Hispanics or Latinos of any race were 66.08% of the population.

Of the 234 households,  46.6% had children under the age of 18 living with them, 66.7% were married couples living together, 15.8% had a female householder with no husband present, and 14.5% were not families. About 12.4% of all households were made up of individuals, and 7.3% had someone living alone who was 65 years of age or older. The average household size was 3.15, and the average family size was 3.46.

In the city, the age distribution was 32.2% under 18, 10.4% from 18 to 24, 25.5% from 25 to 44, 21.4% from 45 to 64, and 10.4% who were 65 years of age or older. The median age was 32 years. For every 100 females, there were 94.5 males. For every 100 females age 18 and over, there were 89.4 males. Males had a median income of $27,375 versus $18,875 for females. The per capita income for the city was $10,847. About 22.0% of families and 25.2% of the population were below the poverty line, including 31.0% of those under age 18 and 21.0% of those age 65 or over.

Education
Agua Dulce is served by the Agua Dulce Independent School District and home to the Agua Dulce Longhorns.

See also

 Battle of Agua Dulce

References

Cities in Texas
Cities in Nueces County, Texas
Cities in the Corpus Christi metropolitan area